Marleen Barr teaches communication and media studies at Fordham University, New York City. She is notable for her significant contributions to science fiction studies, for which she won a Pilgrim Award from the Science Fiction Research Association in 1997. Her primary contributions have been her foundational work in the field of feminist science fiction criticism; her 1981 anthology Future Females: A Critical Anthology "served as an introduction and eye-opener to the field of Feminist Science Fiction."

Selected bibliography

Original criticism
 Creating Room For A Singularity of Our Own: Reading Sue Lange’s “We, Robots" (2013)
 Genre Fission: A New Discourse Practice for Cultural Studies (2000)
 Lost in Space: Probing Feminist Science Fiction and Beyond (1993)
 Feminist Fabulation: Space/Postmodern Fiction (1992)
 Alien to Femininity: Speculative Fiction and Feminist Theory (1987)

Edited works of criticism
 Future Females: A Critical Anthology (1981) (editor)
 Future Females, The Next Generation: New Voices and Velocities in Feminist Science Fiction Criticism (2000) (editor)
 Envisioning the Future: Science Fiction and the Next Millennium (2003) (editor)
 Reading Science Fiction (2009) (co-editor, with James Gunn and Matthew Candelaria)

Fiction
 When Trump Changed: The Feminist Science Fiction Justice League Quashes the Orange Outrage Pussy Grabber (collection, 2018)
 Husband Hunting in Africa (short story, 2016)
 Rudolph The Red Nosed Squirrel or Miracle on 82nd Street: Fiction/Quotation/Exposition (2015)
 Thanksgiving Brunch Mitzvah or, the End of the World for Women (2015)
 The Pen Is Mightier than the Coop Board's Borg Queen: A SF/Memoir (2014)
 Oy It's The Cosmetics, Stupid: Or How Estee Lauder Changed the Post 9/11 World (2013)
 The Birther Committee Inception: An Unreal Manhattan Real Estate Story (2013)
 To The Moon, Said Newt Or Informing New Yorkers That Outer Space Contains Space (2012)
 Oy Pioneer! (novel; 2003)

Awards
 Fulbright lectureship, University of Dortmund, Germany (2006)
 Distinguished Scholar grant, Japan (2000)
 Fulbright lectureship, University of Tübingen, Germany (1989–1990)
 Fulbright lectureship to the University of Düsseldorf, Germany (1983–84)
 Pilgrim Award for lifetime achievement in science fiction criticism (1997) Science Fiction Research Association

References

External links

 Interview with Marleen S. Barr. Original publication: Smith, C. Jason and Ximena Gallardo C. "Oy Science Fiction: On Genre, Criticism, and Alien Love: An Interview with Marleen S. Barr." Reconstruction: Studies In Contemporary Culture. Vol. 5 No. 4 Fall 2005

1953 births
Living people
American feminist writers
American women novelists
American science fiction writers
American literary critics
Women literary critics
American speculative fiction critics
American speculative fiction editors
Feminist studies scholars
Science fiction critics
Science fiction academics
Fordham University faculty
21st-century American novelists
Women science fiction and fantasy writers
21st-century American women writers
Novelists from New York (state)
American women non-fiction writers
21st-century American non-fiction writers
American women academics
American women critics